Clementina Díaz y de Ovando (November 7, 1916 in Laredo, Texas – February 18, 2012 in Mexico City) was a Mexican writer, researcher, and academic specialised in New Spain's art and architecture.

She studied Philosophy and Literature at the National Autonomous University of Mexico (Bachelor's degree, 1939, Master's, 1959, Doctorate, 1965).

Awards and scholarships 
Investigadora Emérita, UNAM, 1983.
Premio Universidad Nacional, 1988.
Miembro de la Junta de Gobierno de la UNAM,1976–1986
Consejera de la Comisión Nacional de Derechos Humanos, 1993.
Cronista de la Universidad Nacional Autónoma de México, 1994.
Presea Miguel Othón de Mendizábal, Instituto Nacional de Antropología e Historia, 1994.

Works 
El Colegio Mexicano de San Pedro y San Pablo (1951)
Obras completas de Juan Díaz Covarrubias (1959)
La Escuela Nacional Preparatoria. Los afanes y los días (1972)
Vicente Riva Palacio. Antología (1976)
La Ciudad Universitaria. Reseña histórica 1929–1955 (1979)
Odontología y publicidad en la prensa mexicana del siglo XIX (1982)
Crónica de una quimera. Una inversión norteamericana en 1879 (1989)
La postura de México frente al patrimonio arqueológico nacional (1990)

References

Bibliography 
UNIVERSIDAD NACIONAL AUTÓNOMA DE MEXICO (1992) Nuestros maestros "Clementina Díaz y de Ovando" p. 121–124, México, ed.Dirección General de Asuntos del Personal Académico, UNAM.   texto en la web Retrieved 2 December 2009.

1916 births
2012 deaths
Mexican academics
Mexican women writers
National Autonomous University of Mexico alumni
American emigrants to Mexico